Georges Levy G.L. 40 HB2 was a three-seated French, amphibious biplane aircraft that was designed in 1917. The aircraft was designed by Blanchard and Le Pen and therefore the aircraft was also known as the Levy-Le Pen. Le Pen was Maurice Jules-Marie Le Pen born in Lorient, Morbihan, France in 1889; he was killed in a car crash in 1919. It was claimed to be the best French amphibious aircraft of World War I, but that is probably due to the low scale production of such aircraft in France at that time.

The Finnish Air Force purchased 12 Georges Levy G.L. 40 HB2s, but they weren't pleased with them. Three aircraft were lost in accidents that claimed lives — and it was given the nickname "the flying coffin" in the 1920s.

In 1920, the Belgian government started an airline in the then Belgian Congo: Ligne Aérienne du Roi Albert (LARA) operated six Levy-Lepen hydroplanes along the Congo River from Leopoldville (now Kinshasa) upstream to Stanleyville (now Kisangani), a distance of 1725 kilometres. The flights started in June 1921 and were discontinued one or two years later.

Operators
 Finnish Air Force - 12 aircraft, withdrawn from use by 1923.
 French Navy - in service from November 1917, app. 100 built, also by Farman. Used in France, Algeria, Greece, Morocco, Senegal and Tunisia.

Portuguese Naval Aviation - 2 aircraft used from 1918 to 1920

Peruvian Air Force - app. 3 delivered
Peruvian Navy
 6 Levy Lepen were used in the Belgian Congo by the Ligne Aerienne du Roi Albert.

United States Navy - 12 used for patrols from Le Croisic in France, two taken to US after the war.

Specifications (G.L. 40 HB2)

See also

References

Notes

Bibliography

 Heinonen, Timo. Thulinista Hornetiin - 75 vuotta Suomen ilmavoimien lentokoneita. Tikkakoski, Finland: Keski-Suomen ilmailumuseo, 1992. .
 Taylor, John W. R. and Jean Alexander. Combat Aircraft of the World. New York: G.P. Putnam's Sons, 1969. .

External links 

1910s French fighter aircraft
Biplanes
GL40
Single-engined pusher aircraft
Aircraft first flown in 1917